Irene Maud Lentz (December 8, 1901 – November 15, 1962), also known mononymously and professionally as Irene, was an American actress turned fashion designer and costume designer. Her work as a clothing designer in Los Angeles led to her career as a costume designer for films in the 1930s. Lentz also worked under the name Irene Gibbons.

Early life

Born in Baker, Montana to Emil Lents and Maud Walters, Lentz started out as an actress under her birth name, appearing in secondary roles in silent films beginning with Mack Sennett in 1921. She played ingénue parts opposite Sennett's leading comedians, Ben Turpin and Billy Bevan. Lentz was directed in her first film by Sennett's production chief, F. Richard Jones; their professional relationship matured into a personal one. They had been married for less than a year when Jones succumbed to tuberculosis in 1930.

Design career

Lentz had been taught sewing as a child and with a flair for style, she decided to open a small dress shop. The success of her designs in her tiny store eventually led to an offer from the Bullocks Wilshire luxury department store to design for their Ladies Custom Salon which catered to a wealthy clientele including a number of Hollywood stars.

Lentz's designs at Bullocks gained her much attention in the film community and she was contracted by independent production companies to design the wardrobe for some of their productions. Billing herself simply as "Irene", her first work came in 1933 on the film Goldie Gets Along, featuring her designs for star Lili Damita. In the 1936 Mae West vehicle Go West, Young Man she was credited as Irene Jones. However, her big break came when she was hired to create the gowns for Ginger Rogers for her 1937 film Shall We Dance with Fred Astaire. This was followed by more designs in another Ginger Rogers film as well as work for other independents such as Walter Wanger Productions, Hal Roach Studios as well as majors such as RKO, Paramount Pictures and Columbia Pictures. During the 1930s, Irene Lentz designed the film wardrobe for leading ladies such as Constance Bennett, Hedy Lamarr, Joan Bennett, Claudette Colbert, Carole Lombard, Ingrid Bergman, and Loretta Young among others.  She "is generally regarded as the originator of the dressmaker suit" that was popular in the late 1930s.

Through her work, Lentz met and married short story author and screenwriter Eliot Gibbons, brother of multi-Academy Award winning Cedric Gibbons, head of art direction at MGM Studios. Despite her success, working under the powerful set designer Cedric while being married to his brother Eliot was not easy. Irene confided to her close friend Doris Day that the marriage to Eliot was not a happy one. Generally regarded as the most important and influential production designer in the history of American films, Cedric Gibbons hired Lentz when gown designer Adrian left MGM in 1941 to open his own fashion house. By 1943 she was a leading costume supervisor at MGM, earning international recognition for her "soufflé creations" and is remembered for her avant-garde wardrobe for Lana Turner in The Postman Always Rings Twice (1946).

In 1950, Lentz left MGM to open her own fashion house. After Lentz was out of the film industry for nearly ten years, Doris Day requested her services for the production Midnight Lace (Universal, 1960). The following year she did the costume design for another Day film, Lover Come Back (1961), and during 1962 worked on her last production, A Gathering of Eagles (released in 1963).

In 1962, after Doris Day noticed that Lentz seemed upset and nervous, Lentz confided in her that she was in love with actor Gary Cooper and that he was the only man that she had ever loved. Cooper had died in 1961.

Awards and nominations

 Nomination for the Academy Award for Best Costume Design, Black-and-White for B.F.'s Daughter (1948)
 Nomination for the Academy Award for Best Costume Design, Color for Midnight Lace (1960)

Death
On November 15, 1962, three weeks before her sixty-first birthday, Lentz took room 1129 at the Knickerbocker Hotel, Los Angeles, checking in under an assumed name. She jumped to her death from her bathroom window.

She had left suicide notes for friends and family, for her ailing husband, and for the hotel residents, apologizing for any inconvenience her death might cause. Per her wishes, she is interred next to her first husband, director F. Richard Jones, at the Forest Lawn Memorial Park Cemetery in Glendale, California.

Legacy

In 2005, Irene Lentz was inducted into the Costume Designers Guild's Anne Cole Hall of Fame.

Selected filmography

References

Informational notes

External links

Irene Lentz – pioneer of an American luxury fashion brand at aenigma

American costume designers
Women costume designers
American fashion designers
California people in fashion
1901 births
1962 suicides
Burials at Forest Lawn Memorial Park (Glendale)
Suicides by jumping in California
People from Hollywood, Los Angeles
People from Baker, Montana
American women fashion designers
20th-century American actresses
1962 deaths